Cao Chuanyu (born 21 January 1995) is a Chinese footballer currently playing as a defender.

Career statistics

Club
.

References

1995 births
Living people
Footballers from Shanghai
Chinese footballers
Chinese expatriate footballers
Association football defenders
Shanghai Shenhua F.C. players
Shanghai Shenxin F.C. players
Chinese expatriate sportspeople in Spain
Expatriate footballers in Spain